Claire Hedenskog (born 10 March 1980) is a Swedish swimmer from Gothenburg, representing Göteborg Sim. Hedenskog participated in the 4 × 100 m freestyle relay prelims at the 2008 Summer Olympics, where the Swedish team finished 11th.

Clubs
 Göteborg Sim

References

1980 births
Living people
Swimmers at the 2008 Summer Olympics
Olympic swimmers of Sweden
European Aquatics Championships medalists in swimming
Göteborg Sim swimmers
Swedish female freestyle swimmers
Swimmers from Gothenburg
20th-century Swedish women
21st-century Swedish women